Lucinda Brayford (1946) is a novel by Australian author Martin Boyd.

Plot summary

This is the story of a beautiful woman set mainly in Melbourne, Victoria and England, from the early 1900s to the Second World War.

Lucinda Vane is born into a wealthy Melbourne family. Nellie Melba appears in the novel, singing at a garden party thrown by Lucinda's mother, and is described as having the "loveliest voice in the world". Lucinda spurns the love of a distinguished family friend, Tony Duff, to marry the dashing aide-de-camp to the Governor, Hugo Brayford. Lucinda's life of ease is replaced by hardship when Hugo takes her to England just before the First World War. She then realises that her husband has married her for her money, and he has a mistress.

Adaptations

This novel was adapted for a television mini-series in 1980, produced by Oscar Whitbread and directed by John Gauci, from a screenplay by Cliff Green, featuring Wendy Hughes as Lucinda, and Sam Neill as Tony Duff. BBC Radio broadcast a dramatisation by Elspeth Sandys in 2005 and 2020.

References

Novels by Martin Boyd
1946 Australian novels
Novels set in Melbourne
Australian novels adapted into television shows
Cultural depictions of Nellie Melba
Cresset Press books